Dichagyris plumbea is a moth of the family Noctuidae. It is found in the Southern Siberian Mountains and Kyrghyzstan.

External links
Noctuinae (Noctuidae) collection of Siberian Zoological Museum
Biodiversity of Altai-Sayan Ecoregion

plumbea
Moths described in 1887